Joan Marie Aylward was a Canadian politician, who sat in the Newfoundland and Labrador House of Assembly from 1996 to 2003 as a member of the Liberals. She represented the electoral district of St. John's Centre.

She was educated at the General Hospital School of Nursing, completing her nursing degree at Memorial University. Aylward was an intensive care nurse at St. Clare's Mercy Hospital. From 1984 to 1990, she served on the faculty for the St. Clare's School of Nursing. Aylward served five years as president of the Newfoundland and Labrador Nurses Union.

She served in the Newfoundland cabinet as Minister of Social Services, as Minister of Health, as Minister of Municipal and Provincial Affairs, as Minister of Finance and as president of Treasury Board.

References

Living people
Liberal Party of Newfoundland and Labrador MHAs
Politicians from St. John's, Newfoundland and Labrador
Women MHAs in Newfoundland and Labrador
21st-century Canadian politicians
21st-century Canadian women politicians
Year of birth missing (living people)